"Dindi" ( - which sounds like Jin-jee in English) is a song composed by Antônio Carlos Jobim, with lyrics by Aloysio de Oliveira.  It is a world-famous bossa nova and jazz standard song. Jobim wrote this piece especially for the Brazilian singer Sylvia Telles. "Dindi" is a reference to a farm named "Dirindi", in Brazil, a place that Jobim and his friend/collaborator Vinicius de Moraes used to visit (according to Helena Jobim, his sister, in her book "Antonio Carlos Jobim - Um Homem Iluminado"). In December 1966, just a short while after Telles had recorded this piece with the guitarist Rosinha de Valença, she was killed in a road accident in Rio de Janeiro.
Céu, tão grande é o céu
E bandos de nuvens que passam ligeiras
Prá onde elas vão, ah, eu não sei, não sei.

English version
English lyrics were added by Ray Gilbert:
"Sky so vast is the sky / with faraway clouds just wandering by / Where do they go / oh I don't know."

Discography
Sylvia Telles - Amor de Gente Moça (Musicas de Antonio Carlos Jobim) (1959), Amor em Hi-Fi (1960)
Sylvia Telles, Edu Lobo, Trio Tamba, Quinteto Villa-Lobos - Reencontro (1965)
Astrud Gilberto - The Astrud Gilberto Album (1965), Jazz Masters 9 (1993)
Frank Sinatra and Antonio Carlos Jobim - Francis Albert Sinatra & Antonio Carlos Jobim (1967)
Elza Soares - Un Show de Elza (1965)
Joe Pass - A Sign of the Times (1965)
Morgana King - It's a Quiet Thing (1965)
Charlie Byrd - Brazilian Byrd (1966)
Baden Powell - Poema on Guitar (1967) 
Blossom Dearie - Soon It's Gonna Rain (1967) 
Claudine Longet - Love is Blue (1968)
Quarteto em Cy (as the Girls from Bahia) - Revolucion con Brasilia (1968)
Ronnie Von - A Misteriosa Luta do Reino de Parassempre Contra o Império de Nuncamais (1969)
Wayne Shorter - Super Nova (1969)
Victor Assis Brasil - Toca Antonio Carlos Jobim'(1970)
Willie Bobo - Do What You Want to Do... (1971), Hell of an Act to Follow (1978)
Flora Purim - Butterfly Dreams (1973)
Eric Gale - Forecast (1973)
Jon Lucien - Song for My Lady (1975)
Norman Connors with Jean Carn - Saturday Night Special (1975)
Sarah Vaughan - Copacabana (1979)
The Singers Unlimited - The Singers Unlimited with Rob McConnell and the Boss Brass (1979)
Antonio Carlos Jobim - Terra Brasilis (1980)
Ella Fitzgerald - Ella Abraça Jobim (1981)
Shirley Horn - Softly (1987)
Eliane Elias - Eliane Elias Plays Jobim (1990) and Brazilian Classics (2003)
Kate Ceberano - Like Now (1990)
Karrin Allyson - Sweet Home Cookin' (1994)
Lee Konitz & The Brazilian Band - Brazilian Serenade (1996)
Natalie Cole - Stardust (1996)
Lee Ritenour - A Twist of Jobim (1997) and World of Brazil (2005), sung by El DeBarge
Bonnie & Francois - Summertime (1998)
Bola Sete – Ocean Memories (1999) 
Jane Monheit - Never Never Land (2000)
David Liebman - The Unknown Jobim (2001)
Ivan Lins - Jobiniando (2001) 
Rebecca Martin - Middlehope (2001)
Carmen McRae - At Ratso's, Vol 1 Live (2002)
Meja - Mellow (2004)
Gary Husband - Aspire (2004) 
Johnny Mathis - Isn't It Romantic (2005)  
Pedro Aznar - Aznar Canta Brasil- Disco 2 Dindi (2005) 
Diane Hubka - I Like it Here - Live in Tokyo (2007)
Daniel Matto - I'm Old Fashioned (2010)
Mina - Stessa spiaggia, stesso mare (1963), L'allieva (2005)
Mike Catalano featuring  Ivan Lins - A Manhattan Affair (2008)
Magos Herrera - Distancia (2009)
Sitti Navarro - Contagious (2009)
Yeahwon Shin - Yeahwon (2010)
Lauren Henderson - Lauren Henderson (2011)
Karen Souza - Hotel Souza'' (2012)
NOVA (band featuring Laura Vall and David Irelan) (2012)
Avi Wisnia - Catching Leaves (2021)

References

See also
List of bossa nova standards

1966 songs
Bossa nova songs
Brazilian songs
Nancy Wilson (jazz singer) songs
Frank Sinatra songs
Portuguese-language songs
Songs with music by Antônio Carlos Jobim
Songs with lyrics by Ray Gilbert
Songs with lyrics by Aloísio de Oliveira
1960s jazz standards